Chulichan is a village in the Kargil district of Ladakh, India, close to the Line of Control with Pakistan-administered Kashmir. It is populated by Shia Brokpas and Baltis.

Geography 
Chulichan is on the left bank of the Indus River in a narrow section of Indus valley known as Brog Yul. It is the last village in Indian-administered Ladakh; the next village on the left bank, Natsara, is in Pakistan-administered Baltistan.

History 
Historically, Chulichan and the adjacent regions were populated by Brokpa people — folklore maintains that they arrived at their current habitat from the Gilgit region. The Brokpa chieftains wielded autonomy in the region, pledging nominal allegiance to the Maqpon rulers of Skardu. 

However, things changed in the seventeenth century when Jamyang Namgyal of Ladakh had a conflict with Ali Sher Khan Anchan of Skardu and had to accept Gurgurdho, a hamlet on the opposite bank of the Indus river, as a boundary between their territories. Consequently, Chulichan and villages to the north of it, such as Ganokh and Marol, became part of Baltistan and influenced by Shia Islam. When Robert Barkley Shaw visited the village in 1876, he found Baltis and Brokpas living there, professing Shia Islam. 

Nevertheless, the Brokpas of Chulichan historically entered into marriages with their ethnic kin in the Dah Hanu region of Ladakh; such connections would cease only with the latter's acceptance of Buddhism c. late nineteenth century. In the aftermath of the First Kashmir War (1947–1948), with Pakistan annexing territories north of Chulichan, it became the only Brokpa village in India to be primarily composed of Muslims.

Demographics
According to the latest census of India (2011), the village has 912 inhabitants across 112 households.

See also
Garkon
Dha
Darchik
Hanoo

Notes

References

 Sources
 

Villages in Kargil tehsil